Wheat fly is a common name for several insects and may refer to:

Contarinia tritici
Mayetiola destructor
Oscinella soror
Sitodiplosis mosellana

Insect common names